NBTF may refer to:
 National Black Theatre Festival, an African-American festival in Winston-Salem, North Carolina
 New Brunswick Teachers' Federation, a Canadian trade union and professional association